The Silin Dam is a concrete gravity dam on the Wu River in Sinan County, Guizhou Province, China. The dam has an associated hydroelectric power plant with a 1,080 MW capacity utilizing 4 x 270 MW Francis turbine-generators. Its reservoir has a  capacity,  of which is flood storage. The dam also supports ship lift. Construction on the dam began in October 2004, the dam began to impound the river in March 2008 and by May 2009, the power plant's first generator was operational. The remaining generators were operational by December 2009.

See also 

 List of power stations in China

References

Hydroelectric power stations in Guizhou
Dams in China
Gravity dams
Dams completed in 2008
Dams on the Wu River
Energy infrastructure completed in 2009
Roller-compacted concrete dams